The 1993 Southeastern Conference baseball tournament was the first year the SEC held separate tournaments for the Eastern Division and the Western Division. The Eastern Division tournament was held at Sarge Frye Field in Columbia, South Carolina, from May 20 through 23. The Western Division tournament was held at Alex Box Stadium in Baton Rouge, LA also from May 20 through 23.  won the Eastern Division tournament and LSU won the Western Division tournament. All games played in the tournament were added to the teams' records from the 24-game conference regular season.

As the tournament champion with the highest conference winning percentage, LSU was named SEC champion and awarded the league's automatic bid to the NCAA tournament.

Regular-season results

Tournaments

Eastern Division

Western Division

All-Tournament Teams 
{|
|

|
 
|

See also 
 College World Series
 NCAA Division I Baseball Championship
 Southeastern Conference baseball tournament

References 

 SECSports.com All-Time Baseball Tournament Results
 SECSports.com All-Tourney Team Lists

Tournament
Southeastern Conference Baseball Tournament
Southeastern Conference baseball tournament
Southeastern Conference baseball tournament
Southeastern Conference baseball tournament
College baseball tournaments in Louisiana
College sports tournaments in South Carolina
Baseball competitions in Baton Rouge, Louisiana
Baseball competitions in South Carolina
Sports in Columbia, South Carolina